Troutdale Airport , also known as Troutdale-Portland Airport, is a corporate, general aviation and flight-training airport serving the city of Troutdale, in Multnomah County, Oregon, United States. It is one of four airports in the Portland metropolitan area owned and operated by the Port of Portland. Troutdale Airport was established in 1920 as a private airfield, then purchased by the Port of Portland in 1942. It serves as a reliever airport for nearby Portland International Airport (PDX).

Located in North Troutdale, and east of Portland, and south of Troutdale Reynolds Industrial park. Northeast of Fairview and Wood Village, and East of Interlachen and North Gresham. The airport includes a Federal Aviation Administration contract control tower, one paved runway, hangars, fueling facilities, a helipad, and a small passenger terminal. Troutdale Airport is often referred to by its IATA airport code, TTD.

Operations 
Located in Portland's eastern Multnomah County suburbs, Troutdale Airport is connected to the metropolitan area by TriMet buses. The primary public access point is NW Frontage Road, on the south side of the airport. Facilities include a  runway  (Rwy 07/25 - 5400' x 150'), Taxiway (Twys A, B - 50' wide) and a FAA control tower, hangars, fueling facilities, a helipad, and a small main passenger terminal. The main terminal includes airport offices, and a waiting area. 

The airport was purchased by the Port of Portland in 1942, and is serving as a reliever airport for nearby Portland International Airport (PDX). It has been developed to support all forms of general aviation and is home to four fixed-base operator (FBO), several limited FBOs, flight schools, and aircraft repair and maintenance facilities. It is also a popular base for scenic aerial tours of the Columbia River Gorge provided by Envi Adventures and recreational flying.

Training 

 Gorge Winds Aviation
 Joe Echo-Hawk
 Hillsboro Heli Academy

Services 

 Northwest Aero
 Troutdale Aircraft Services
 TTD Hangars
 Premier Aircraft Engines
 Emerald Aircrafters
 Hillsboro Aviation
 Treetop Aviation
 T-Hangers

Airlines

Facilities and aircraft 

Accidents and incidents 

 On August 12, 1962, at about 4 am, United Air Lines Flight 861, a scheduled flight from Chicago to Portland, inadvertently landed at Troutdale airport. As the plane broke from cloud cover, Captain S.R. Whipple, a senior pilot flying for United for more than 25 years, saw the runway directly in front of him. As he was already cleared to land by the Portland tower, Whipple mistook the lights of the Troutdale airport for Portland International Airport and landed on Troutdale's 4,630-foot long runway. No passenger injuries and no aircraft damage was reported. The perplexed, 81 passengers disembarked shortly after their unexpected landing in Troutdale and were transported with their luggage to the Portland airport, approximately 11 miles away. However, deplaning was delayed as passengers and crew waited for boarding stairs to arrive from Portland airport. United Air Lines determined that the DC-8 could take off from the 4,600-foot airstrip in Troutdale, and brought in a pilot, Bartlett Stephens, from Seattle to handle the task. The fuel in the DC-8 was pumped nearly empty, leaving just enough to ferry the aircraft to Portland International Airport, and everything not bolted to the plane was removed. A fence was taken down and some of the grass burned to extend the runway as much as possible for the large jet in preparation for the short flight to Portland airport. The plane was positioned as far back as possible on runway 25, as its tail hung out across Northeast Graham Road. After the aircraft and airport were prepared, pilot Stephens throttled up the jet and started rolling forward at approximately 12:15 pm. The plane took off without incident and rotated a little over halfway down the runway. A few minutes later the DC-8 touched down at Portland International Airport, its intended destination. Following the incident, United Airlines was quoted in the Oregonian newspaper stating the company was conducting an investigation and that Captain Whipple had been grounded pending the outcome. A few days later, Captain Whipple’s license was suspended by the Federal Aviation Administration for 30 days, and also suspended the co-pilot for two weeks.
 On June 30, 2017, a Robinson R22 helicopter was damaged while performing an emergency landing during training. The pilot lost control of the helicopter's tail rotor as a result of the helicopter slowing down too quickly, the helicopter plummeted to the ground, and rolled over. The aircraft was declared a total loss, but there were no injuries reported.
 On 10 May 1958, A Boeing Stratoliner S.307  registered N75385 being operated by Quaker City Airways was taken out of storage at Troutdale Airport and prepared for a ferry flight to determine fuel and oil consumption. The auxiliary gasoline tanks that were installed in the cabin were not tested prior to the flight, despite their being fuel leaks of an undefined source. During the flight there was a blast in the fuselage and fire could be seen coming from the accessory compartment. A forced landing was carried out on a elevated plain with grass-covered boulders; The plane went up in flames resulting in its loss. This plane was one of 10 built of this specific model, with this being the  2nd loss of this aircraft type, there where no reported injuries.

See also
 Troutdale, Oregon
 Multnomah County Poor Farm
 Gresham, Oregon

References

External links
 Troutdale Airport, official site
 Envi Adventures
 Gorge Winds Aviation, Inc.
 FedEx Ground Troutdale Airport
 Amazon PDX9 at Troutdale Airport
 Comfort Inn Troutdale Airport, Portland East
 Coast Truck Center Troutdale Airport
 Amazon DPD7 Troutdale Airport
 Sundial Beach Troutdale Airport
 Emerald Aircrafters Inc Troutdale Airport
 Troutdale Aircraft Services
 Dash Air, Inc. At KTTD
 Hillsboro Aero and Heli Academy Troutdale Airport official site
 Aerial photo as of 31 May 2002 from USGS The National Map
 
 

Troutdale
Port of Portland (Oregon)
Troutdale, Oregon